Birar is a village in the Jhajjar district of Haryana, India. It has a private college school named Cambridge International. It is in Matenhail tehsil.

Demographics of 2011
, Birar had a population of 2,900 in 850 households. Males (1481) constitute 51.4% of the population and females (1419) 48.59%. Birar has an average literacy (1534) rate of 69.72%, lower than the national average of 74%: male literacy (887) is 57.93%, and female literacy (647) is 42.17% of total literates (1534). In Birar, Jhajjar 12.18% of the population is under 6 years of age (268).

Adjacent villages

 Humayunpur
 Ladayan
 Jamalpur
 Bhurawas
 (A)Kheri Madanpur

Villages of similar name in India
In Uttarakhand (State), Almora (District),Jainti(Sub District), Birar(Village)
In Haryana (State), Jhajjar (District), Matenhail(Sub District), Birar(Village)
In Rajasthan (State), Bharatpur (District), Kaman(Sub District), Birar(Village)
In Uttar Pradesh (State), Gorakhpur (District), Sahjanwa(Sub District), Birar(Village)
In Uttar Pradesh (State), Sonbhadra (District), Dudhi(Sub District), Birar(Village)
In Jharkhand (State), Kodarma (District), Chandwara(Sub District),Birar(Village)

References 

Villages in Jhajjar district